Hernandezine is a tetrahydroquinoline alkaloid that has been isolated from Thalictrum.

References

Benzylisoquinoline alkaloids